Runway safety is concerned with reducing harm that could occur on an aircraft runway. Safety means avoiding incorrect presence (incursion) of aircraft, inappropriate exits (excursion) and use of the wrong runway due to confusion. The runway condition is a runway's current status due to meteorological conditions and air safety.

Definitions of runway accidents
Several terms fall under the flight safety topic of runway safety, including incursion, excursion, and confusion. Terms such as runway event or runway accident are used for such incidents.

Runway incursion

Runway incursion involves an aircraft, and a second aircraft, vehicle, or person. It is defined by ICAO and the U.S. FAA as "Any occurrence at an aerodrome involving the incorrect presence of an aircraft, vehicle or person on the protected area of a surface designated for the landing and take off of aircraft."

Runway excursion

Runway excursion is an incident involving only a single aircraft, where it makes an inappropriate exit from the runway.  This can happen because of pilot error, poor weather, or a fault with the aircraft. A runway overrun is a type of excursion where the aircraft is unable to stop before the end of the runway.

Runway excursion is the most frequent type of landing accident, slightly ahead of runway incursion.  For runway accidents recorded between 1995 and 2007, 96% were of the 'excursion' type.

Confusion
Runway confusion is when a single aircraft uses the wrong runway, or a taxiway, for takeoff or landing. Examples of runway confusion incidents include Singapore Airlines Flight 006, Comair Flight 5191 and Air Canada Flight 759.

Monitoring of runway safety
The U.S. FAA publishes an annual report on runway safety issues, available from the FAA website. New systems designed to improve runway safety, such as Airport Movement Area Safety System (AMASS) and Runway Awareness and Advisory System (RAAS), are discussed in the report. AMASS narrowly prevented a serious collision in the 2007 San Francisco International Airport runway incursion.

In the 1990s the U.S. FAA  conducted a study about a civilian version of 3D military thrust vectoring to prevent jetliner catastrophes 

Some instruments for runway safety include ILS, LLWAS, Microwave landing system, Transponder landing system, as well as Runway Awareness and Advisory System.

Meteorological conditions
The "runway condition" is a runway's current status in relation to current meteorological conditions and air safety.
Dry: the surface of the runway is clear of water, snow or ice.
Damp: change of color on the surface due to moisture.
Wet: the surface of the runway is soaked but there are no significant patches of standing water.
Water patches: patches of standing water are visible.
Flooded: there is extensive standing water.
According to the JAR definition, a runway with water patches or that is flooded is considered to be contaminated.

See also
 Runway safety area

References

 
Aviation safety
Airport engineering
Airport infrastructure